An arcuate (arch-shaped) vessel may refer to:
Arcuate vessel of the kidney:
Arcuate arteries of the kidney
Arcuate vein
Arcuate vessels of the uterus